Mogyoktangs are Korean public bathhouses with lockers, showers, Jacuzzis, steam rooms, massage and barbershops. Unlike the more elaborate jjimjilbangs which include sleeping areas, snack bars, PC bangs, etc. mogyoktangs are usually only bathhouses and not open 24 hours. Some close on Thursdays due to mogyoktang sharing the same first character as the Korean word for Thursday. They are also divided into men-only and women-only sections.

See also
 Jjimjilbang
 Sentō
 Sauna
 Taiwanese hot springs
 Ttaemiri

References

South Korean popular culture
Bathing

ko:목욕탕#대한민국의 목욕탕